Vikrant Chaturvedi (born 1 August 1974) is an Indian actor and voice-dubbing artist. He has acted in Bollywood and has also voiced Indian animation and for many Hindi dubs of Hollywood and other foreign films and media. He played Mir Khorason in Chakravartin Ashoka Samrat.

Filmography

Animated series

Television series

Dubbing roles

Live action films

See also
Dubbing (filmmaking)
List of Indian dubbing artists

References

External links
 
 

1974 births
Male actors from Allahabad
Indian male voice actors
Living people
Male actors in Hindi cinema